Gonatodes daudini, also known commonly as the Grenadines clawed gecko or the Union Island gecko, is a species of lizard in the family Sphaerodactylidae. The species is endemic to Union Island in Saint Vincent and the Grenadines.

Conservation status
The Union Island gecko is threatened by demand from the international pet trade. Due to its distinct markings, it is one of the most trafficked reptiles in the Eastern Caribbean. Although it is granted domestic protection from export, reportedly wild-caught animals have been reported as offered for sale in several European countries. The species listed on Appendix I of the Convention on International Trade in Endangered Species of Wild Fauna and Flora (CITES). Trained local residents have patrolled the tropical dry forest the gecko inhabits since 2017 in an attempt to deter poachers.

Etymology
The specific name, daudini, is in honor of naturalist Jacques Daudin (1926–2011) who lived on Union Island.

Habitat
The preferred habitat of G. daudini is remnant dry forest.

Behavior
G. daudini is diurnal and terrestrial.

Reproduction
G. daudini is oviparous.

References

Further reading
Daudin, Jacques; de Silva, Mark (2007). "An annotated checklist of the amphibians and terrestrial reptiles of the Grenadines with notes on their local natural history and conservation". Applied Herpetology 4 (2): 163–175.
Powell, Robert; Henderson, Robert W. (2005). "A new species of Gonatodes (Squamata: Gekkonidae) from the West Indies". Caribbean Journal of Science 41 (4): 709–715. (Gonatodes daudini, new species).
Shepherd, Chris R.; Janssen, Jordi; Noseworthy, Josh (2019). "A case for listing the Union Island Gecko Gonatodes daudini in the Appendices of CITES". Global Ecology and Conservation 17: e00549.

Gonatodes
Reptiles of the Caribbean
Endemic fauna of Saint Vincent and the Grenadines
Reptiles described in 2005